Ghoghardiha is a city and a notified area in Darbhanga division, Madhubani district in the state of Bihar, India.

The old name of this village was Gau-ghaddi (cow home). Later became Ghoghardiha.

Demographics
At the 2011 India census, Ghoghardiha had a population of 157,224 (80,796 males and 76,428 females.

Air Transport

Darbhanga Airport is the nearest airport around 73 km away in India and Rajbiraj Airport is the nearest airport roughly 59 km away in Nepal and can be accessed by Kunauli border. One can easily take erickshaw from border to Airport. Shree Airlines operates daily flights between Rajbiraj and Kathmandu
The flight will cost roughly Rs 1,800 INR.

References

Cities and towns in Madhubani district